Antoine Duchesne (born September 12, 1991) is a Canadian former cyclist, who competed as a professional from 2013 to 2022.

In May 2015, Duchesne helped his teammate Bryan Coquard to victory on the first stage of the Four Days of Dunkirk, especially in the finale where he took long pulls in the leading group, setting his teammate up for the win. He was named in the start list for the 2015 Vuelta a España and the 2016 Tour de France.

Major results

2009
 1st  Road race, National Junior Road Championships
 5th Overall Tour de l'Abitibi
2012
 3rd Overall Tour de Québec
1st Stage 1
2013
 1st  Road race, National Under-23 Road Championships
 3rd Road race, National Road Championships
 8th Overall Coupe des nations Ville Saguenay
2014
 2nd Polynormande
2015
 3rd Polynormande
 10th Overall Four Days of Dunkirk
2016
 1st  Mountains classification Paris–Nice
 8th Overall Tour of Alberta
2018
 1st  Road race, National Road Championships
2021
 2nd Road race, National Road Championships

Grand Tour general classification results timeline

References

External links 

1991 births
Living people
Canadian male cyclists
Sportspeople from Saguenay, Quebec
Cyclists at the 2016 Summer Olympics
Olympic cyclists of Canada
Cyclists from Quebec